Akiko Takeda is a Japanese international table tennis player.

She won a bronze medal at the 2001 World Table Tennis Championships in the women's doubles with Mayu Kishi-Kawagoe.

See also
 List of table tennis players

References

Japanese female table tennis players
Living people
World Table Tennis Championships medalists
Year of birth missing (living people)